Woolshed Flat is a locality near the southern end of the Clare Valley in South Australia. It is located in the District Council of Clare and Gilbert Valleys.

Geography
Woolshed Flat lies in the Mid North of the state, situated north-west of Rhynie, west of Main North Road.

Community
There is no longer a school in the locality. The nearest are at Riverton. There was also a Methodist church established in 1859 as a Wesleyan church, which is still standing, surrounded by its cemetery, but no longer used for worship.

Transportation
Woolshed Flat Road runs from the town of Rhynie on the Horrocks Highway (Main North Road) through Woolshed Flat to the Balaklava Road near Halbury.

References

External links

Towns in South Australia
Mid North (South Australia)